Zimba is a market town in southern Zambia, 70 kilometres northeast of Livingstone, on the main road and railway line to Lusaka.

See also
Railway stations in Zambia

References

Populated places in Southern Province, Zambia